Ebrahimabad-e Bala (also Romanized as Ebrāhīmābād-e Bālā; also known as Korīt-e Bālā) is a village in Nakhlestan Rural District, in the Central District of Tabas County, South Khorasan Province, Iran. At the 2006 census, its population was 187, in 47 families.

References 

Populated places in Tabas County